Nikolayevsky is a rural locality (a settlement) in Chernushinsky District, Perm Krai, Russia. The population was 11 as of 2010. There is 1 street.

Geography 
Nikolayevsky is located 20 km south of Chernushka (the district's administrative centre) by road. Tanypskiye Klyuchi is the nearest rural locality.

References 

Rural localities in Chernushinsky District